Frea laevepunctata is a species of beetle in the family Cerambycidae. It was described by Thomson in 1858. It is known from Cameroon, Equatorial Guinea, Central Africa, the Democratic Republic of the Congo, and Gabon.

References

laevepunctata
Beetles described in 1858